The M15 motorway is a Hungarian motorway connects the M1 motorway to Bratislava, the capital of Slovakia. The Hungary-Slovakia border crossing is at Rajka (Hungary) and Čunovo (Slovakia).

Until 2019, the M15 motorway featured grade separation like all motorways, but did not feature four lanes. The M15 has been upgraded to four lanes by December 2019, a few months ahead of schedule.

Openings timeline

Junctions, exits and rest area

 The route is full length motorway.

Maintenance
The operation and maintenance of the road by Hungarian Public Road Nonprofit Pte Ltd Co. This activity is provided by this highway engineer.
 near Lébény (M1), kilometre trench 142

Payment
Hungarian system has 2 main type in terms of salary:

1, time-based fee vignettes (E-matrica); with a validity of either 10 days (3500 HUF), 1 month (4780 HUF) or 1 year (42980 HUF).

2, county vignettes (Megyei matrica); the highway can be used instead of the national sticker with the following county stickers:

{| class="wikitable"
|- 
!Type of county vignette !! Available section
|-
|Győr-Moson-Sopron County
| full length (0 km – 15 km)
|}

European Route(s)

See also 

 Roads in Hungary
 Transport in Hungary
 International E-road network

References

External links 

National Toll Payment Services Plc. (in Hungarian, some information also in English)
 Hungarian Public Road Non-Profit Ltd. (Magyar Közút Nonprofit Zrt.)
 National Infrastructure Developer Ltd.

15